Frances Esemplare (September 3, 1934 – December 9, 2017) was an American actress best known for her multi-episode recurring role as Marianucci "Nucci" Gualtieri, mother of Paulie Gualtieri (played by Tony Sirico) on The Sopranos from 2001 until 2007.

Early life 
Born Frances Spalluto, Esemplare was a lifelong resident of Staten Island, New York.

Career 
Beginning in 2001, she was cast as Nucci Gualtieri, mother of mobster Paulie Gualtieri, on the HBO television series, The Sopranos. First introduced as Paulie Gualtieri's elderly mother, it is later revealed in the series that she is Gualtieri's biological aunt, who adopted him as a child. Frances Esemplare debuted in the May 2001 episode, "Army of One," and her character remained on the show until "Kennedy and Heidi" in May 2007. Esemplare appeared in nine episodes during her recurring role on the series, from season 3 to season 6.

Filmography

Film

Television

Death 
Frances Esemplare died on December 9, 2017, at the age 83. Esemplare was buried in Green-Wood Cemetery in Brooklyn, New York, on December 13, 2017.

References

External links

1934 births
2017 deaths
American television actresses
Actresses from New York City
People from Staten Island
American people of Italian descent
Burials at Green-Wood Cemetery
21st-century American women